Robert Melancton Metcalfe (born April 7, 1946) is an engineer and entrepreneur from the United States who helped pioneer the Internet starting in 1970. He co-invented Ethernet, co-founded 3Com and formulated Metcalfe's law, which describes the effect of a telecommunications network. Since January 2011, he has been Professor of Innovation and Entrepreneurship at The University of Texas at Austin. He is also the Murchison Fellow of Free Enterprise.

Metcalfe has received various awards, including the IEEE Medal of Honor and National Medal of Technology and Innovation for his work developing Ethernet technology.

In addition to his accomplishments, Metcalfe has made several predictions which failed to come to pass, separately forecasting the demise of the Internet, wireless networks, and open-source software during the 1990s.

Early life 
Robert Metcalfe was born in 1946 in Brooklyn, New York. His father was a test technician who specialized in gyroscopes. His mother was a homemaker, but later became the secretary at Bay Shore High School. In 1964, Metcalfe graduated from Bay Shore High School to join the MIT Class of 1968. He finally graduated from MIT in 1969 with two S.B. degrees, one in electrical engineering and the other in industrial management from the MIT Sloan School of Management. He then went to Harvard for graduate school, earning his M.S. in applied mathematics in 1970 and his PhD in computer science (applied mathematics) in 1973.

Career 
While pursuing a doctorate in computer science, Metcalfe took a job with MIT's Project MAC after Harvard refused to let him be responsible for connecting the school to the brand-new ARPAnet.  At MAC, Metcalfe was responsible for building some of the hardware that would link MIT's minicomputers with the ARPAnet. ARPAnet was initially the topic of his doctoral dissertation, but the first version was not accepted. His inspiration for a new dissertation came while working at Xerox PARC, where he read a paper about the ALOHA network at the University of Hawaii.  He identified and fixed some of the bugs in the AlohaNet model and made his analysis part of a revised thesis, which finally earned him his Harvard PhD in 1973.

Metcalfe was working at PARC in 1973 when he and David Boggs invented Ethernet, initially a standard for connecting computers over short distances.  Metcalfe identifies the day Ethernet was born as May 22, 1973, the day he circulated a memo titled "Alto Ethernet" which contained a rough schematic of how it would work.  "That is the first time Ethernet appears as a word, as does the idea of using coax as ether, where the participating stations, like in AlohaNet or ARPAnet, would inject their packets of data, they'd travel around at megabits per second, there would be collisions, and retransmissions, and back-off," Metcalfe explained. Boggs identifies another date as the birth of Ethernet: November 11, 1973, the first day the system actually functioned.

In 1979, Metcalfe departed PARC and co-founded 3Com, a manufacturer of computer networking equipment, in his Palo Alto apartment.  In 1980 he received the ACM Grace Hopper Award for his contributions to the development of local networks, specifically Ethernet.  In 1990, in a boardroom skirmish, the 3Com board of directors chose Éric Benhamou to succeed Bill Krause as CEO of the networking company instead of Metcalfe. Metcalfe left 3Com and began a 10-year stint as a publisher and pundit, writing an Internet column for InfoWorld. He became a venture capitalist in 2001 and is now a general partner at Polaris Venture Partners.  In 1997, he co-founded Pop!Tech, an executive technology conference.

In November 2010 Metcalfe was selected to lead innovation initiatives at The University of Texas at Austin's Cockrell School of Engineering. He began his appointment in January 2011 and retired as an Emeritus Professor of Electrical and Computer Engineering at the end of 2021.

Metcalfe was a keynote speaker at the 2016 Congress of Future Science and Technology Leaders and in 2019 he presented the Bernard Price Memorial Lecture in South Africa.

In June of 2022, Metcalfe announced he would be returning to MIT full-time to join the CSAIL lab as a Research Affiliate and Computational Engineer working with the MIT Julia (programming language) Lab.

Awards 
In 1996, Metcalfe was awarded the IEEE Medal of Honor for "exemplary and sustained leadership in the development, standardization, and commercialization of Ethernet." 

In 1997, he was elected as a member into the National Academy of Engineering for the development of the Ethernet.

In 2003 he received the Marconi Award for "For inventing the Ethernet and promulgating his Law of network utility based on the square of the nodes"

On March 14, 2003, Metcalfe received the National Medal of Technology from President Bush in a White House ceremony "for leadership in the invention, standardization, and commercialization of Ethernet".

In May 2007, along with 17 others, Metcalfe, was inducted to the National Inventors Hall of Fame in Akron, Ohio, for his work with Ethernet technology.

In October 2008, Metcalfe received the Fellow Award from the Computer History Museum "for fundamental contributions to the invention, standardization, and commercialization of Ethernet."

Web predictions 
Metcalfe predicted in 1995 that the Internet would suffer a "catastrophic collapse" the following year; he promised to eat his words if it did not. During his keynote speech at the sixth International World Wide Web Conference in 1997, he took a printed copy of his column that predicted the collapse, put it in a blender with some liquid and then consumed the pulpy mass. He had tried to eat his words printed on a very large cake, but the audience would not accept this form of "eating his words."

Selected publications 
 "Packet Communication", MIT Project MAC Technical Report MAC TR-114, December 1973 (a recast version of Metcalfe's Harvard dissertation)
 "Zen and the Art of Selling", Technology Review, May/June 1992

References

External links 

 A more detailed interview
 Why IT Matters
 Video Interview of Robert Metcalfe on March 10, 2009 at the Computer History Museum
 

1946 births
Living people
American computer businesspeople
American computer scientists
American telecommunications industry businesspeople
American electrical engineers
American manufacturing businesspeople
American technology chief executives
Grace Murray Hopper Award laureates
IEEE Medal of Honor recipients
Harvard University alumni
Ethernet
MIT School of Engineering alumni
MIT Sloan School of Management alumni
National Medal of Technology recipients
Members of the United States National Academy of Engineering
University of Texas at Austin faculty
Scientists at PARC (company)
Bay Shore High School alumni